Sweet Exorcist were a British music duo consisting of Richard Barratt (DJ Parrot) and Richard H. Kirk. They were among the flagship bleep techno acts on Warp Records in the late 1980s.

History
Sweet Exorcist, which was named after a Curtis Mayfield track, was the project of Sheffield-based musicians Richard H. Kirk (Cabaret Voltaire) and Richard ‘DJ Parrot’ Barratt (later a member of All Seeing I).

Kirk and Barratt knew each other since the mid-1980s. Barratt had already supported a Cabaret Voltaire tour of the UK in 1986. By 1989, Cabaret Voltaire had wrapped up a contract with EMI and had effectively stopped working together. Kirk passed the time by going to clubs and working in the studio with Barratt, who at the time was running Sheffield's main club night, Jive Turkey.

After both worked on several tracks together, Barratt suggested making a club track with studio test tones. In January 1990, the tracks were released as "Testone" on Warp. It defined the bleep techno sound, by making playful use of sampled sounds from Yellow Magic Orchestra's Computer Game (1978) and the film Close Encounters of the Third Kind (1977). The next release was "Clonk", also on Warp. For both singles, remix versions were released.

In 1991, the duo released the C.C.E.P., which later came as a CD version, C.C.C.D. and was also known as Clonks Coming. The band released the album Spirit Guide to Low Tech on Touch Records.

2011 saw the release of the compilation album RetroActivity on Warp.

Discography

Albums
 1994: Spirit Guide to Low Tech (Touch Records)
 2011: RetroActivity (compilation album; Warp)

Singles & EPs
 1990: "Testone" (Warp)
 1990: "Testone Remixes" (Warp)
 1990: "Clonk" (Warp)
 1990: "Per Clonk (Remix)" (Warp)
 1991: C.C.E.P. (Warp)
 1991: "Popcone" (Plastex)

References

External links
 
 
 

1990 establishments in England
1994 disestablishments in England
Intelligent dance musicians
English techno music groups
English electronic music duos
Musical groups from Sheffield
Musical groups established in 1990
Musical groups disestablished in 1994
Warp (record label) artists
Rhythm King artists